The Heniochi (Heníochoi "charioteers")  were an ancient tribe inhabiting northwest shores of Colchis (present-day Abkhazia, northwestern Georgia) and some say Phasis area. Their country was called Heniocheia.

They are attested by a number of ancient historians and others alike, namely: Aristotle, Artemidorus Ephesius, Ovid, Pliny the Elder, Arrian, Strabo and others. It is pointed out that they lived in a quite wide area from Dioscurias, to Trabzon. 

Sources from the 5th to 4th century BC till the 1st century AD note the Heniokhs lived from modern Sochi till Pitiunt - Dioskourias. It is difficult to identify with certainty the relationship between the tribes mentioned by classical authors and the contemporary ethnic groups.  Various scholars relate the tribe to modern day Georgians (specifically Zans and Svans) and Abkhaz.

The tribe of Heniochs according to Artemidorus of Ephesus, occupied in the 5th - 1st cc. B.C, the Black Sea littoral that is part of present-day Abkhazia: - from the environs of Pitiunt or Pityus to the river Achaeuntus (the Shakhe river near present-day Tuapse).  Aristotle describes the Heniochi (along with the Acaei) as a group of people "ready enough to kill and eat men."

Notes

References

 Georgian Soviet Encyclopedia, vol. 11, pg.624, Tb. 1987.
 D. Asheri, "The Achaeans and the Heniochi. Reflections on the Origins and History of a Greek Rhetorical Topos", quoted from 

Ancient peoples of Georgia (country)
Tribes in Greco-Roman historiography
Ancient peoples of Anatolia